Yamandú Ramón Antonio Orsi Martínez (born 13 June 1967) is a Uruguayan politician serving as the 24th intendant of Canelones Department since November 26, 2020. A member of the Movement of Popular Participation – Broad Front he previously served as the 23th intendant of Canelones from 2015 to 2020.

Graduated from the Instituto de Profesores Artigas in 1991 as a History teacher, he taught in different liceos (secondary schools) in the Canelones, Florida and Maldonado Departments. He began to be a political militant during his adolescence, being part of the Vertiente Artiguista until 1990, when he joined the Movement of Popular Participation (MPP) that had been founded the previous year. In 2015 he was elected Intendant of Canelones, and in 2020 he was re-elected in the position. He is seen as a possible presidential candidate for 2024.

Early life and education 
Orsi was born Canelones and raised in a rural area of Canelones Department, between the towns of Santa Rosa and San Antonio, as the son and second child of Pablo "Bebe" Orsi, rural laborer and Carmen Martínez, a seamstress. The family struggled financially during Orsi's early years and for a time lived in a house without electricity. At the age of five, he moved to the city of Canelones due to his father's spine disease, which prevented him from working in the fields. There the family set up a grocery store and Orsi attended Primary School No. 110 and Liceo Tomás Berreta. 

Raised in a Catholic family, he was an altar boy in the neighborhood chapel. In his adolescence he practiced folk dance, and at the age of fifteen he won a contest to be part of a municipal cast, which he integrated until he was 26. In turn, in his teens he became politically active, militating in the Vertiente Artiguista until 1990, when he joined the Movement of Popular Participation. He began by participating in a collection of signatures for the 1989 amnesty referendum on the Law on the Expiration of the Punitive Claims of the State.

In 1986 he began a degree in international relations at the University of the Republic, however he dropped out after a month. Subsequently, he enrolled at the Institute of Artigas Teachers (IPA) in Montevideo to study for a teaching post in History in secondary education, graduating in 1991.

Political career 

A member of the National Directorate of the MPP, Orsi has been part of the departmental executive commission of the Broad Front since July 2005. He served as Secretary General of the Municipality of Canelones during the two terms of government of Intendant Marcos Carámbula.

In early March 2015, he resigned to run for Intendant. His candidacy was supported by various sectors of the Broad Front, such as the MPP, the Communist Party, the Vertiente Artiguista and Casa Grande. In the 2015 election, he was elected Intendant of Canelones Department with 37% of the vote, being the candidate with the most votes from the party with the most votes, according to the Ley de Lemas system. He took office on July 9, 2015.

In October 2019, facing the second round of the general election, Orsi was appointed campaign manager for Broad Front nominee Daniel Martínez Villamil. On February 7, 2020, he resigned from the position of Intendant of Canelones, being succeeded by Tabaré Costa. However, he launched his campaign for re-election, and in the municipal election of that year, he was re-elected in office.

Personal life 
Orsi is married to Laura Alonso Pérez. They have twin children: Lucía and Victorio (b. 2012). He lives with his family in Salinas.

References

External links 

 

1967 births
Living people
Intendants of Canelones Department
Uruguayan politicians
Movement of Popular Participation politicians
People from Canelones, Uruguay